Foreign Sarakku is a 2022 Indian Tamil-language thriller film directed by Vigneshwaran Karuppusamy and starring Gopinath, Sundar ,and Hussain. It was released on 8 July 2022.

Cast

Production
Vigneshwaran Kuppusamy, a short filmmaker, chose to make the film with financial backing from the lead actors Gopinath and Sundar, who often worked on his short films. The film was shot in Gujarat and coastal Tamil Nadu.

Reception
The film was released on 8 July 2022 across Tamil Nadu. A critic from Maalai Malar gave the film a mixed review, noting that it was "low on excitement". A reviewer from Dina Thanthi gave the film a negative review. A critic from MyKollywood wrote "the movie grabs the attention of the audience right from the word go".

References

External links

2022 films
Indian action thriller films
2020s action thriller films
2020s Tamil-language films